Kaulahea I was a High Chief of the Hawaiian island of Maui.

Reign 
During his reign, war did not occur between Maui and any of the other islands. This is a contrast to the disturbance in Kamaloohua's reign. Samuel Kamakau wrote that Kaulahea was born at Kukaniloko Birth Site.

Family 
Kaulahea was a son of Kahokuohua, Chief of Molokai and Hikakaiula, the Chiefess. Kaulahea followed his grandfather Loe as ruler of Maui, and married his sibling, Kapohanaupuni. She bore two sons, Kakae and Kakaalaneo to Kaulahea. Kaulahea's sons jointly ruled as Chiefs of Maui.

References

 Abraham Fornander, An Account of the Polynesian Race: Its Origin and Migrations, Rutland, VT: Charles E. Tuttle Company, 1969.

Hawaiian monarchs